The University of Auckland Faculty of Engineering is one of eight faculties that make up the University of Auckland. Located on Symonds Street, Auckland, it has been consistently rated as the best Engineering School in New Zealand for quality of research.

Facilities 

The faculty itself is based at the University of Auckland city campus, with many research groups based at the Newmarket Campus, including the Center for Advanced Composite Materials (CACM), and the Yacht Research Unit (YRU).
The Faculty has been undergoing recent renovation at its city Campus, including a modern atrium area with café, updated library, four new computer labs, two new large lecture theaters, and updates to equipment and seating in many smaller lecture rooms.

New Zealand's only environmental scanning electron microscope was acquired by the Research Center for Surface Materials Science (RCSMS) in 2005.

History 

The faculty was made famous for its role in Team New Zealand's America's Cup victory in 1995 and 2000, instrumental in its contribution was the world's first Twisted Flow Wind Tunnel built in 1994 at the Tamaki Campus that allows better simulation of the flow of wind over yacht sails by varying the angle of attack with height. The smaller DeBray wind tunnel situated at the city campus is used for a variety of research and teaching purposes, but is primarily used commercially to provide pedestrian wind environment tests for new building consents for the Auckland City Council using its 1:400 scale model of the Auckland City central business district.

Departments 
 Department of Chemical and Materials Engineering
 Department of Civil and Environmental Engineering
 Department of Electrical and Computer Engineering
 Department of Engineering Science
 Department of Mechanical Engineering

Degrees

Undergraduate 
 Bachelor of Engineering (Honors)
 Biomedical Engineering
 Chemical and Materials Engineering
 Civil Engineering (including Environmental Engineering)
 Computer Systems Engineering
 Electrical and Electronic Engineering
 Engineering Science
 Mechanical Engineering (including Woodfibre Composites)
 Mechatronics Engineering
 Software Engineering
 Bachelor of Engineering / Bachelor of Arts Conjoint
 Bachelor of Engineering / Bachelor of Commerce Conjoint
 Bachelor of Engineering / Bachelor of Property Conjoint
 Bachelor of Engineering / Bachelor of Science Conjoint
 Bachelor of Engineering / Bachelor of Laws Conjoint
 Bachelor of Engineering / Bachelor of Laws (Honours) Conjoint

Postgraduate 
Master of Engineering
Master of Engineering Management
Master of Engineering Studies
Master of Operations Research
Doctor of Philosophy
Doctor of Engineering
Diplomas and Certificates
Graduate Diploma in Engineering
Graduate Diploma in Engineering (Transportation)
Graduate Diploma in Operations Research
Postgraduate Certificate in Geothermal Energy Technology
Postgraduate Certificate in Light Metals Reduction Technology

References

External links
 Official website of the Faculty of Engineering, University of Auckland

Engineering, Faculty of